Björn Fredrik Arvid Kugelberg (9 February 1905 – 27 October 1980) was a Swedish sprinter. He competed in the 200 m and 4×400 m events at the 1928 Summer Olympics and placed fourth in the relay.

References

External links
 

1905 births
1980 deaths
Athletes (track and field) at the 1928 Summer Olympics
Swedish male sprinters
Olympic athletes of Sweden
People from Karlskrona
Sportspeople from Blekinge County
20th-century Swedish people